Heads and Tails may refer to:

Heads And Tails, a solitaire card game which uses two decks of playing cards.
Heads and Tails (film), a 1995 Russian Film
Heads and Tails (Russian telecast), a Ukrainian Russian-speaking travel series
Heads and Tails (TV series), a British children's programme

See also
Heads or Tails (disambiguation)
Heads and Tales (disambiguation)
Obverse and reverse
Fish Heads and Tails, a 1989 album by Goodbye Mr. Mackenzie
"Heads Carolina, Tails California", a 1996 song by Jo Dee Messina